Macrobathra euspila is a moth in the family Cosmopterigidae. It was described by Turner in 1932. It is found in Australia, where it has been recorded from New South Wales.

References

Natural History Museum Lepidoptera generic names catalog

Macrobathra
Moths described in 1932